Julien Columeau (born 13 November 1972 in Valence, France) is a French novelist living in Pakistan, writing in French and Urdu. He settled in Pakistan in 2003 where he has lived since, and lived in India for eight years prior to that.

References 

French novelists
21st-century Urdu-language writers
21st-century French non-fiction writers
French expatriates in India
French emigrants to Pakistan
1972 births
Living people